County Route 105 (CR 105) is a major north–south county road in Suffolk County, New York, in the United States. It is a four-lane, mostly divided highway that runs from CR 104 to Sound Avenue in Northville, west of the western terminus of CR 48 in Mattituck.

Route description

The road begins at an at-grade interchange with CR 104 in the David Allen Sarnoff Pine Barrens Preservation Area, southwest of Flanders. It immediately curves from an east–west trajectory to a north–south one before its intersection with New York State Route 24 (NY 24). From that point on, the road becomes a semi-limited-access highway as it crosses the Peconic River before running through Riverhead Golf Course and crossing Sawmill Creek. A diamond interchange exists for a park road in Indian Island County Park, followed by a quarter-cloverleaf interchange for Hubbard Avenue near the Main Line of the Long Island Rail Road.

North of NY 25 in Aquebogue, a cloverleaf interchange was planned for the formerly proposed Long Island Expressway Extension. CR 105 replaces Union Avenue south of the intersection with CR 43 (Northville Turnpike) in Northville, only to run along the west side of the former Riverhead Air Park, and finally terminates at Sound Avenue.

History

The at-grade interchange with CR 104 was built for one purpose; a future extension into Central Suffolk County. The at-grade interchange was to be upgraded to a real interchange, as was the case with many existing intersections. From there, the road was to run west through the David A. Sarnoff Pine Barrens Preserve, then was to cross over CR 88 (Speonk–Riverhead Road), where it was to turn north as it ran along the south and west sides of the Suffolk County Community College Eastern Campus before crossing over CR 51 at Bald Hill. The road was to turn from north back to west as it ran along Hot Water Street and Cranberry Highway, which runs through land that was owned partially by the Calverton Naval Weapons Industrial Reserve Plant. A wye interchange was to exist with CR 90 before terminating at CR 111 (Port Jefferson–Westhampton Beach Highway). This was to be the eastern leg of the formerly proposed Central Suffolk Highway, which was designed to reunite the two sections of NY 24.

Major intersections

References

External links

Suffolk CR 105 (Greater New York Roads)

105